The Alleyne Baronetcy, of Four Hills in Barbados, is a title in the Baronetage of Great Britain. It was created on 6 April 1769 for John Alleyne, Speaker of the Barbados House of Assembly. His grandson, the third Baronet, was President of the Steel and Iron Institute.

The family surname is pronounced "Alleen".

Alleyne baronets, of Four Hills (1769)
Sir John Gay Alleyne, 1st Baronet (1724–1801)
Sir Reynold Abel Alleyne, 2nd Baronet (1789–1870)
Sir John Gay Newton Alleyne, 3rd Baronet (1820–1912)
Sir John Meynell Alleyne, 4th Baronet (1889–1983)
Sir John Olpherts Campbell Alleyne, 5th Baronet (born 1928)

The heir apparent is the present holder's only son Richard Meynell Alleyne (b. 1972).

See also
Alleyn baronets
Baronet#Barbados

Notes

Alleyne
1769 establishments in Great Britain